François Blais is a Canadian politician from Quebec, who was elected to the National Assembly of Quebec in the 2014 election and named Minister of Employment. He represented the electoral district of Charlesbourg as a member of the Quebec Liberal Party. From February 27, 2015 to January 28, 2016 he served as Minister of Education, Recreation and Sports following the resignation of Yves Bolduc. After January 28, he returned to the Employment and Labour portfolio.

He was defeated in the 2018 election by Jonatan Julien of the Coalition Avenir Québec.

Prior to his election to the legislature, Blais was the dean of social sciences at Université Laval.

References

Quebec Liberal Party MNAs
Living people
French Quebecers
Members of the Executive Council of Quebec
Politicians from Quebec City
Academic staff of Université Laval
21st-century Canadian politicians
Year of birth missing (living people)
Université Laval alumni